Kenneth A. Skinner (1861 – 25 July 1932) was a champion roller speed skater in the late nineteenth century.

Life

Skinner was born in 1861 in Nova Scotia and came to the United States at the age of 17. He married actress Adelaide Cushman in 1888. He died at Pondville State Hospital in Massachusetts in 1932.

Career

Skinner was considered the American champion speed skater in 1884, although this was before the sport was standardized by any governing body so definitive championships are hard to determine.

According to fellow skater Bright Star, Skinner was the inventor of ball bearing wheeled skates.

Skinner sometimes competed on skates against opponents on bicycles. Skinner lost these races, but not by much. Bicycles of the time were primitive.

According to the New York Clipper, Skinner "throws forward his chest in a most remarkable manner" while skating.

Races won

Source: Roller skating made easy, 1884

References

Roller skaters by nationality
Canadian male speed skaters
Sportspeople from Nova Scotia
Roller skating in the United States
1932 deaths
Sportspeople from Boston